An early warning system is a warning system that can be implemented as a chain of information communication systems and comprises sensors, event detection and decision subsystems for early identification of hazards. They work together to forecast and signal disturbances that adversely affect the stability of the physical world, providing time for the response system to prepare for the adverse event and to minimize its impact.

To be effective, early warning systems need to actively involve the communities at risk, facilitate public education and awareness of risks, effectively disseminate alerts, and warnings and ensure there is constant state of preparedness. A complete and effective early warning system supports four main functions: risk analysis, monitoring and warning; dissemination and communication; and a response capability.

Application
Risk analysis involves systematically collecting data and undertaking risk assessments of predefined hazards and vulnerabilities. Monitoring and warning involves a study of the factors that indicate a disaster is imminent, as well as the methods used to detect these factors. Dissemination and communication concerns communicating the risk information and warnings to reach those in danger in a way that is clear and understandable. Finally, an adequate response capability requires the building of national and community response plan, testing of the plan, and the promotion of readiness to ensure that people know how to respond to warnings.

An early warning system is more than a warning system, which is simply a means by which an alert can be disseminated to the public.

In defense 
Early-warning radars, early warning satellites, and Airborne early warning and control are systems used for detecting potential missile attacks. Throughout human history the warning systems that use such have malfunctioned several times, including some nuclear-weapons-related false alarms.

The easiest or most likely artificial signals from Earth to be detectable from around distant stars are brief pulses transmitted by such anti-ballistic missile (ABM) early-warning and space-surveillance radars during the Cold War and later astronomical and military radars.

For natural disasters 
Scientists are researching and developing systems to predict eruptions of volcanoes, earthquakes and other natural disasters.

Earthquakes

For diseases 
Early warning systems could be developed and used to prevent and mitigate pandemics, e.g. before they spillover from other animals to humans, and disease outbreaks.

For climate adaptation 

Because of changes in extreme weather and sea level rise, due to climate change, the UN has recommended early warning systems as key elements of climate change adaptation and climate risk management. Flooding, cyclones and other rapidly changing weather events can make communities in coastal areas, along floodzones and reliant on agriculture very vulnerable to extreme events. To this end the UN is running a partnership titled "Climate Risk and Early Warning Systems" to aid high risk countries with neglected warning systems in developing them.

European countries have also seen early warning systems help communities adapt to drought, heat waves, disease, fire, and other related effects of climate change. Similarly the WHO recommends early warning systems to prevent increases in heatwave related morbidity and disease outbreaks.

For chemical concerns 
A large number of chemical substances (approximately 350,000) have been created and used without full understanding of the hazards and risks that they each pose. Chemicals have the potential to cause environmental degradation and harm to human health. Chemical prioritisation and early warning systems are being created to help understand which chemicals should be focused upon for regulatory interventions.

The Environment Agency in England have set up a National scale Prioritisation and Early Warning System (PEWS) for contaminants of emerging concern.

History 
Since the Indian Ocean tsunami of 26 December 2004, there has been a surge of interest in developing early warning systems. However, early warning systems can be used to detect a wide range of events, such as vehicular collisions, missile launches, disease outbreaks, and so forth. See warning system for a wider list of applications that also can be supported by early warning systems.

See also
Emergency communication system

References

Disaster management tools